Uriel Jové Balero (born 29 July 1999), commonly known as Uri, is an Argentine footballer who plays as a central defender for Spanish club FC Cartagena.

Club career
Born in Carmen, General López Department, Santa Fe, Uri moved to Alicante, Valencian Community at early age and represented Hércules CF, CD El Campello and Kelme CF as a youth. On 5 August 2018, after finishing his formation, he joined Tercera División side UD Rayo Ibense, but left the club in the following month.

Uri subsequently moved to fellow fourth division side Estudiantes de Murcia CF, and made his senior debut on 16 September 2018 by starting in a 1–2 home loss against CAP Ciudad de Murcia. He scored his first goal the following 3 February, netting the equalizer in a 1–1 away draw against the same club.

On 27 June 2019, Uri signed for FC Cartagena and was assigned to the reserves also in the fourth tier. On 17 August of the following year, after contributed with two first team appearances as the side achieved promotion to Segunda División, he renewed his contract until 2023 and was definitely promoted to the main squad.

Uri made his professional debut on 27 September 2020, starting in a 1–3 away loss against CD Leganés. On 31 August of the following year, he moved to Segunda División RFEF side Águilas FC on a one-year loan deal.

References

External links

1999 births
Living people
People from General López Department
Argentine footballers
Spanish footballers
Association football defenders
Segunda División players
Segunda División B players
Segunda Federación players
Tercera División players
FC Cartagena B players
FC Cartagena footballers
Águilas FC players
Sportspeople from Santa Fe Province